This is a list of cricketers who played first-class matches for Hazara cricket team in Pakistan. Hazara played nine first-class matches in the Patron's Trophy during the 1983/84, 1984/85 and 1985/1986 seasons.

Ansaar Ali
Arshad Khattak
Arshad Qureshi
Asghar Khan
Ashraf Butt
Asif Aslam
Awais Qureshi
Basharat Khan
Fahim Nawab
Farooq Khan
Farrukh Ahmed
Ijaz Butt
Imran Khaliq
Inayatullah
Javed Ahmed
Junaid Qureshi
Kaleem Pasha
Kashif Kazmi
Khawar Nadeem
Kifayat Hussain
Manzoor Ahmed
Masood Mirza
Mohammad Faridoon
Mohammad Junaid
Mohammad Zia
Nadir Khan
Nasim Fazal
Rafat Nawaz
Riaz Ahmed
Rizwan Bokhari
Sajid Aziz
Shahid Iqbal
Shakir Hussain
Tahir Mahmood
Tariq Awan
Tariq Iqbal
Wajid Elahi
Wasim Fazal
Wasim Hasan
Wasim Sheikh

References

Hazara cricketers